The North Mersey Branch (NMB) is a railway line that connected the Liverpool and Bury Railway at Fazakerley Junction with .

History 
The scheme was authorised in May 1861, a contract was let to George Thomson in 1864 and the line opened on 27 August 1866.

The line initially had no stations, terminating in the North Mersey goods yard where an end-on connection was made to the Mersey Docks and Harbour Board (MDHB) rail network.  opened in 1866, being renamed in North Mersey and Alexandra Docks in 1892.

An early passenger station, first noted in 1878, on the line was Aintree Cinder Lane, this temporary station didn't appear in the timetables and was only used for race traffic, it was replaced by  station which opened in 1910, it also only operated on race days at Aintree Racecourse and saw its last service on 25 March 1961. 

 station opened on 7 September 1914, when the section of track from North Mersey Branch Junction was electrified, it became a halt in 1916 and closed on 7 July 1924.

Usage 

Intermodal and engineering trains ran from Garston, Edge Hill and as far away as Southampton, along the North Mersey Branch to Aintree Container Base, Aintree Metal Box and Fazakerley P-Way Yard. Annual Grand National Express services ran from London Euston and other locations in the country, direct to Aintree Station via the North Mersey Branch and Bootle Branch Line.

In 1988 BR decided to cancel the Grand National Express permanently, due to attacks by vandals along the line. Bricks and other missiles would be hurled at the trains when coming down the line in Litherland on the old site of the North Mersey Junction at the end of the crossover above the Merseyrail Northern Line.; and too many trains and coaches were arriving at Aintree with significant damage. In 1986 the line to Aintree Container Base was cut, leaving no further need for container trains along the line. In 1987 the short spur to Fazakerley sidings was closed, and the Metal Box service had finished by 1991, leaving no regular goods services on the North Mersey Branch.

Today 
The section of the line between Sefton Junction and North Mersey Branch Junction is no longer maintained to basic Network Rail operational standards and as of December 2017 is completely overgrown in places.

Occasionally diesel-powered engineering/maintenance trains used the branch to access the Southport line, saving the need to reverse at Sandhills.

For trains to access the branch, a key must first be obtained in advance from the Merseyrail IECC signalling centre which unlocks the gate allowing access to/from the branch line at Aintree.

The line is largely single track and is not electrified.

As of October 2020, much of the North Mersey Branch is completely overgrown in most places. However, the spur behind Aintree Station, which formerly housed the Grand National platforms, was severed from the branch junction in favour of an electrical power supply cabinet installed by Network Rail. A section of rail on the Leeds Liverpool Canal Bridge between Bootle New Strand and Bootle Oriel Road was cut during the bridge's renovation and replacement. Although it does appear that the track on this section has been reinstated.

Future 
Plans to open this section as part of Merseyrail's Northern Line have been put forward in Sefton's transport plan, with the first details to emerge about its possible reopening being published by the media on 28 February 2008. The Crosby Herald newspaper reported that the line could be reopened in conjunction with a proposed new stadium for Liverpool F.C., to provide additional transport links via the town of Litherland, likely to cost millions. This was again mentioned in Merseytravel's 30-year plan of 2014.

In January 2019, Campaign for Better Transport released a report identifying the line which was listed as Priority 2 for reopening. Priority 2 is for those lines which require further development or a change in circumstances (such as housing developments).

References

Notes

Citations

Bibliography

External links 

 

Historic transport in Merseyside
Lancashire and Yorkshire Railway
Railway lines opened in 1866
Closed railway lines in North West England